The Pacific Wrestling Federation (PWF) World Heavyweight Championship is a professional wrestling world heavyweight championship and one of the three titles that make up the Triple Crown Heavyweight Championship. It was created in 1973 by All Japan owner Giant Baba, after he won a series of ten matches against Bruno Sammartino (twice - one win, one draw), Terry Funk, Abdullah the Butcher, The Destroyer, Wilbur Snyder (twice - one win, one draw), Don Leo Jonathan, Pat O'Connor and Bobo Brazil.

The title, which had originally been classed as a world title, was downgraded to regional status after All Japan joined the National Wrestling Alliance but retained its status as the top All Japan singles title until 1983. In 1989 Jumbo Tsuruta and Stan Hansen would unify this, the NWA United National Championship and the NWA International Heavyweight title to create the Triple Crown Heavyweight Championship. The original belt remained in use as part of the Triple Crown until 2013, when the three belts were replaced by a single belt. As the original top belt in All Japan, its design formed the front plate of the new belt; the other two belts' designs took the sides.

Title history
Key

Combined reigns

See also
PWF World Tag Team Championship
PWF United States Heavyweight Championship
PWF All Asia Heavyweight Championship
NWA United National Championship
Triple Crown Heavyweight Championship
NWA International Heavyweight Championship

Footnotes

References

External links
PWF Heavyweight Title History

All Japan Pro Wrestling championships
World heavyweight wrestling championships